Shannon Regina "Pee Wee" Johnson (born August 18, 1974) is an American basketball player born in Hartsville, South Carolina. She last played for the Seattle Storm in the WNBA. She became the head coach at Coker College in Hartsville, South Carolina in September 2015.

Career
After her collegiate playing days, Johnson played for the Columbus Quest with whom she won the 1997 and 1998 American Basketball League championships.

Starting in 1999, Johnson played for the Orlando Miracle of the WNBA. She also played for Fenerbahçe İstanbul from Turkey in winter 1999–00 season. The team moved to Connecticut in 2003 and is now known as the Connecticut Sun. Before the 2004 season, Johnson was traded to the San Antonio Silver Stars.

In March 2007, Johnson signed with the Detroit Shock.
Names Pat Hewitt, her high school basketball coach, her biggest influence. 
On March 7, 2008, Johnson signed with the Houston Comets. When the Comets folded, she was not picked in the dispersal draft, therefore becoming a free agent.

Johnson was a WNBA All-Star in 1999, 2000, 2002 and 2003.
She played in Spain for Ros Casares Valencia (2001-2002), Perfumerías Avenida (2002-2003), Dynamo Moscow (2003-2004), Wisla Cracovia (2004-2005), Cadi la Seu (2005-2006), Tarsus Beledeyesi (2006-2007), Palacio de Congresos Ibiza (2008-2010) and CD Zamarat (2010-2011). She was also a key factor in the club as she helped carry the team to Division One on May 1, 2011. S

USA Basketball
Johnson competed with USA Basketball as a member of the 1995 Jones Cup Team that won the Bronze in Taipei. She averaged 4.3 points per game.

Johnson was also invited to be a member of the Jones Cup team representing the US in 1996. She helped the team to a 9–0 record, and the gold medal in the event. Johnson averaged 4.8 points per games and recorded 18 steals, second-highest on the team.

Johnson represented the US at the 1997 World University Games held in Marsala, Sicily, Italy in August 1997. The USA team won all six games, earning the gold medal at the event. Johnson averaged 2.3 points per game.

In 2002, Johnson was named to the national team which competed in the World Championships in Zhangjiagang, Changzhou and Nanjing, China. The team was coached by Van Chancellor. In the quarterfinals, Johnson came off the bench to score 20 points, to help the US team win against Spain and advance. After beating Australia in the semifinals, the USA team faced Russia for the gold medal. Johnson had a steal late in the game when the USA team held a two-point margin. the USA went on to win and capture the gold medal. Johnson averaged 9.1 points per game and had 18 assists, tied for second on the team.

She was also a member of the USA Basketball team winning the gold medal at the 2004 Summer Olympics.

Vital statistics
Position: Guard
Height: 
College: South Carolina
Team(s): Orlando Miracle, Connecticut Sun, San Antonio Silver Stars, Detroit Shock, Houston Comets (WNBA)

South Carolina statistics
Source

References

External links

Johnson's biography at usabasketball.com
Shannon Johnson's U.S. Olympic Team bio
Johnson signs with the Houston Comets
 http://www.encancha.com/articulo/13419

1974 births
Living people
African-American basketball players
African-American basketball coaches
All-American college women's basketball players
American expatriate basketball people in Italy
American expatriate basketball people in Spain
American expatriate basketball people in Turkey
American women's basketball players
Basketball players at the 2004 Summer Olympics
Basketball players from South Carolina
Columbus Quest players
Connecticut Sun players
Detroit Shock players
Fenerbahçe women's basketball players
Houston Comets players
Medalists at the 2004 Summer Olympics
Olympic gold medalists for the United States in basketball
Orlando Miracle players
People from Hartsville, South Carolina
Point guards
San Antonio Stars players
Seattle Storm players
Shooting guards
South Carolina Gamecocks women's basketball players
Universiade gold medalists for the United States
Universiade medalists in basketball
Women's National Basketball Association All-Stars
Medalists at the 1997 Summer Universiade
21st-century African-American sportspeople
21st-century African-American women
20th-century African-American sportspeople
20th-century African-American women
20th-century African-American people
United States women's national basketball team players